The 2015 Bedford Borough Council election took place on 7 May 2015 to elect members of Bedford Borough Council in England. This was on the same day as other local elections.

Overall Results

A total of 115,477 valid votes were cast and there were 1,060 rejected ballots.
The turnout was 66.3%

Council Composition
Prior to the election the composition of the council was:

After the election the composition of the council was:

Ind - Independent

Ward Results
Incumbent councillors are denoted by an asterisk.

Brickhill

Bromham and Biddenham

Castle

Cauldwell

Clapham

De Parys

Eastcotts

Elstow & Stewartby

Goldington

Great Barford

Harpur

Harrold

Kempston Central and East

Kempston North

Kempston Rural

Kempston South

Kempston West

Kingsbrook

Newnham

Oakley

Putnoe (2 Seats)

Queens Park

Riseley

Sharnbrook

Wilshamstead

Wootton

Wyboston

References

2015 English local elections
May 2015 events in the United Kingdom
2015
21st century in Bedfordshire